Lepidochrysops plebeja, the twin-spot blue, is a butterfly of the family Lycaenidae. It was described by Arthur Gardiner Butler in 1898. It is found in Botswana, Zimbabwe, Mozambique, Malawi, Zambia and South Africa.

Adults are on wing from November to January. There is one generation per year.

The larvae feed on Lantana rugosa. Third and later instar larvae feed on the brood of Camponotus niveosetus ants.

Subspecies
 Lepidochrysops plebeja plebeja (northern Eastern Cape, KwaZulu-Natal, north-western Free State, Gauteng, Mpumalanga, Limpopo, North West and Northern Cape)
 Lepidochrysops plebeja proclus (Hulstaert, 1924)

References

Butterflies described in 1898
plebeja
Butterflies of Africa
Taxa named by Arthur Gardiner Butler